Justin LeShayne Jackson (born October 13, 1990) is an American professional basketball player for CS Dinamo București of the Romanian Liga Națională. He played college basketball for the Cincinnati Bearcats.

High school career
Jackson began his high school career at Eau Gallie High School, in Melbourne, Florida.  Under Coach Brandon Palmer, Jackson starred on the varsity team, as a freshman and sophomore, leading the Commodores to a district championship in his sophomore year, over Vero Beach High School and its legendary coach, Chuck Loewendick.

As a high school junior, in the 2008–09 season, Jackson attended Montverde Academy, in Montverde, Florida, where averaged 15.0 points, 12.3 rebounds, and 3.1 blocks per game, for coach Kevin Sutton. He was named to the Florida Association of Basketball Coaches (FABC) and Florida Sports Writer's Association (FSWA) State All-Independent teams.

In November 2009, Jackson signed a National Letter of Intent to play college basketball for the University of Cincinnati.

As a high school senior, in the 2009–10 season, Jackson attended Arlington Country Day School, in Jacksonville, Florida, where he helped the Apaches to the FHSAA Class 2A finals, and a record of 21-6.

College career
In his freshman season at Cincinnati, Jackson played in 35 games off the bench, while averaging 2.5 points and 2.5 rebounds, in 12.9 minutes per game, while shooting 52.7 percent from the field (39 of 74).

In his sophomore season, Jackson played in 37 games, with 20 starts, averaging 5.1 points and 4.2 rebounds, in 21.1 minutes per game. He led Cincinnati with 61 blocks, and ranked fifth in the Big East, averaging 1.7 blocks per game.

In his junior season, Jackson played in 30 games with, 22 starts, averaging 3.8 points and 5.1 rebounds, in 18.8 minutes per game. He also ranked eighth in the Big East, averaging 1.4 blocks.

In his senior season, Jackson was named the AAC Defensive Player of the Year, while also earning second-team All-AAC and District 25 second-team All-American honors. In 34 games (all starts), he averaged 11.1 points, 7.3 rebounds, and 2.9 blocks, in 27.8 minutes per game. He finished his career with 219 total blocks, ranking the fourth most in school history.

Professional career
After going undrafted in the 2014 NBA draft, Jackson joined the Charlotte Hornets for the 2014 NBA Summer League. On August 4, 2014, he agreed to terms with Nea Kifissia of Greek Basket League. However, he was released by the club a month later, before appearing in an official game for them.

On November 1, 2014, Jackson was selected by the Rio Grande Valley Vipers, with the 18th overall pick, in the 2014 NBA Development League draft. He was later traded to the Texas Legends on draft night.

On August 17, 2015, Jackson signed with Bisons Loimaa of the Finnish Korisliiga. On January 7, 2016, he signed with Czarni Słupsk of the Polish Basketball League. On July 25, 2016, he re-signed with Czarni Slupsk. On January 9, 2017, he parted ways with the club. On January 20, 2017, he signed with Greek club Aris Thessaloniki.

On October 8, 2019, he has signed with Atomerőmű SE of the NB I/A. Jackson averaged 7.8 points, 6.4 rebounds, 1.4 steals and 1.3 blocks per game. On August 4, 2020, he re-signed with the team. In 2021, Jackson joined Urunday Universitario of the Uruguayan league, and averaged 13.3 points, 6.3 rebounds, and 1.9 assists per game. On January 21, 2022, Jackson signed with CS Dinamo București of the Romanian Liga Națională.

Personal
Jackson is the son of Shauna and Larry Jackson, and he has two brothers, LaTray Green and Corbin Jackson, and a sister, Shaulya Murray.  Jackson's youngest brother, Corbin, currently plays Division II college basketball at the Florida Institute of Technology, under coach Billy Mims.

References

External links
Champions League profile
Draftexpress.com profile
Eurobasket.com profile
Cincinnati Bearcats bio

1990 births
Living people
African-American basketball players
American expatriate basketball people in Cyprus
American expatriate basketball people in Finland
American expatriate basketball people in Greece
American expatriate basketball people in Hungary
American expatriate basketball people in Israel
American expatriate basketball people in the Philippines
American expatriate basketball people in Poland
American expatriate basketball people in Slovakia
American expatriate basketball people in Uruguay
American men's basketball players
APOEL B.C. players
Aris B.C. players
Atomerőmű SE players
Basketball players from Florida
Bisons Loimaa players
Centers (basketball)
Cincinnati Bearcats men's basketball players
Czarni Słupsk players
Magnolia Hotshots players
Maccabi Kiryat Motzkin basketball players
People from Cocoa Beach, Florida
Philippine Basketball Association imports
Power forwards (basketball)
Small forwards
Texas Legends players
Montverde Academy alumni
21st-century African-American sportspeople